Miss Jane Marple is a fictional character in Agatha Christie's crime novels and short stories. Miss Marple lives in the village of St. Mary Mead and acts as an amateur consulting detective. Often characterized as an elderly spinster, she is one of Christie's best-known characters and has been portrayed numerous times on screen. Her first appearance was in a short story published in The Royal Magazine in December 1927, "The Tuesday Night Club", which later became the first chapter of The Thirteen Problems (1932). Her first appearance in a full-length novel was in The Murder at the Vicarage in 1930, and her last appearance was in Sleeping Murder in 1976.

Origins
The character of Miss Marple is based on friends of Christie's step grandmother/aunt (Margaret Miller, née West). Christie attributed the inspiration for the character to multiple sources, stating that Miss Marple was "the sort of old lady who would have been rather like some of my step grandmother's Ealing cronies – old ladies whom I have met in so many villages where I have gone to stay as a girl". Christie also used material from her fictional creation, spinster Caroline Sheppard, who appeared in The Murder of Roger Ackroyd. When Michael Morton adapted the novel for the stage, he replaced the character of Caroline with a young girl. This change saddened Christie and she determined to give old maids a voice: Miss Marple was born.

Christie is popularly believed to have taken the name from Marple railway station, through which she passed, though a letter she wrote to a fan appears to prove that the name was inspired by a visit to a sale at Marple Hall in the same town, near her sister Margaret Watts' home at Abney Hall.

Character
The character of Jane Marple in the first Miss Marple book, The Murder at the Vicarage, is quite different from how she appears in later books. This early version of Miss Marple is a gleeful gossip and not an especially nice woman. The citizens of St. Mary Mead like her but are often tired of her nosy nature and the fact she seems to expect the worst of everyone. In later books, she becomes a kinder and more modern person.

Miss Marple solves difficult crimes thanks to her shrewd intelligence, and St. Mary Mead, over her lifetime, has given her seemingly infinite examples of the negative side of human nature. Crimes always remind her of a previous incident, although acquaintances may be bored by analogies that often lead her to a deeper realisation about the true nature of a crime. She also has a remarkable ability to latch onto a casual comment and connect it to the case at hand. In several stories, she is able to rely on her acquaintance with Sir Henry Clithering, a retired commissioner of the Metropolitan Police, for official information when required.

Miss Marple never married and has no close living relatives. Her nephew, the "well-known author" Raymond West who appears in some stories, including The Thirteen Problems, Sleeping Murder, and Ingots of Gold (which also feature his wife, Joyce Lemprière). Raymond overestimates himself and underestimates his aunt's mental acuity. Miss Marple employs young women (including Clara, Emily, Alice, Esther, Gwenda, and Amy) from a nearby orphanage, whom she trains for service as general housemaids after the retirement of her long-time maid-housekeeper, faithful Florence. She was briefly looked after by her irritating companion, Miss Knight. In her later years, companion Cherry Baker, first introduced in The Mirror Crack'd From Side to Side, lives in.

Miss Marple has never worked for her living and is of independent means, although she benefits in her old age from the financial support of her nephew Raymond. She is not from the aristocracy or landed gentry, but is quite at home among them; as a gentlewoman, Miss Marple may thus be considered a female version of the gentleman detective, a staple of British detective fiction. She demonstrates a remarkably thorough education, including some art courses that involved the study of human anatomy using human cadavers. In They Do It with Mirrors (1952), it is revealed that Miss Marple grew up in a cathedral close, and that she studied at an Italian finishing school with American sisters Ruth Van Rydock and Caroline "Carrie" Louise Serrocold.

While Miss Marple is described as "an old lady" in many of the stories, her age is rarely mentioned and is not consistently presented. In At Bertram's Hotel, published in 1965, it is said she visited the hotel when she was 14 and almost 60 years have passed since then, implying that she's nearly 75 years old but in 4:50 from Paddington, published almost a decade earlier in 1957, she says she will be "90 next year."  

Excluding Sleeping Murder, 41 years passed between the first and last-written novels, and many characters grow and age. An example would be the Vicar's nephew: in The Murder at the Vicarage, the Reverend Mr Clement's nephew Dennis is a teenager; in The Mirror Crack'd from Side to Side, it is mentioned that the nephew is now an adult and has a successful career. The effects of ageing are seen on Miss Marple, such as needing a holiday after illness in A Caribbean Mystery, but she is if anything more agile in Nemesis, set only 16 months later.

Miss Marple's background is described in some detail, albeit in glimpses across the novels and short stories in which she appears. She has a very large family, including a sister, the mother of Raymond, and Mabel Denham, a young woman who was accused of poisoning her husband Geoffrey (The Thumb Mark of St. Peter).

Bibliography
Agatha Christie wrote 12 novels and 20 short stories featuring Miss Marple.

Miss Marple Series
 The Murder at the Vicarage (1930, Novel)
 The Body in the Library (1942, Novel)
 The Moving Finger (1943, Novel)
 A Murder Is Announced (1950, Novel)
 They Do It with Mirrors (1952, Novel) - also published as Murder With Mirrors
 A Pocket Full of Rye (1953, Novel)
 4.50 from Paddington (1957, Novel) - also published as What Mrs. McGillicuddy Saw!
 The Mirror Crack'd from Side to Side (1962, Novel)
 A Caribbean Mystery (1964, Novel)
 At Bertram's Hotel (1965, Novel)
 Nemesis (1971, Novel)
 Sleeping Murder (1976, Novel)

Miss Marple short story collections
 The Thirteen Problems (1932 short story collection featuring Miss Marple, also published as The Tuesday Club Murders)
The Regatta Mystery and Other Stories (1939, Collection)
 Three Blind Mice and Other Stories (1950, Collection)
 The Adventure of the Christmas Pudding (1960, Collection)
 Double Sin and Other Stories (1961, Collection)
 Miss Marple's Final Cases and Two Other Stories (short stories collected posthumously, also published as Miss Marple's Final Cases, but only six of the eight stories actually feature Miss Marple) (written between 1939 and 1954, published 1979)
 Miss Marple: The Complete Short Stories, published 1985, includes 20 from 4 sets: The Thirteen Problems, The Regatta Mystery, Three Blind Mice and Other Stories, and Double Sin and Other Stories.

Miss Marple also appears in "Greenshaw's Folly", a short story included as part of the Poirot collection The Adventure of the Christmas Pudding (1960). Four stories in the Three Blind Mice collection (1950) feature Miss Marple: "Strange Jest", "Tape-Measure Murder", "The Case of the Caretaker", and "The Case of the Perfect Maid".

The Autograph edition of Miss Marple's Final Cases includes the eight in the original plus "Greenshaw's Folly".

Continuations not by Christie
 Marple: Twelve New Mysteries, collection with stories written by Naomi Alderman, Leigh Bardugo, Alyssa Cole, Lucy Foley, Elly Griffiths, Natalie Haynes, Jean Kwok, Val McDermid, Karen M. McManus, Dreda Say Mitchell, Kate Mosse, and Ruth Ware (published 2022)

Books about Miss Marple
 The Life and Times of Miss Jane Marple – a biography by Anne Hart

Stage
A stage adaptation of Murder at the Vicarage, by Moie Charles and Barbara Toy, was first seen at Northampton on 17 October 1949; it was directed by Reginald Tate, starred the 35-year-old Barbara Mullen as Miss Marple, and after touring, reached the Playhouse Theatre in London's West End on 14 December. Having run till late March 1950, it then went on tour again.

In July 1974, Mullen (by then 60) returned to the role in another national tour of the same play, culminating 12 months later when the show opened at London's Savoy Theatre on 28 July 1975. At the end of March 1976, the Miss Marple role was taken over by Avril Angers, after which the production transferred to the Fortune Theatre on 5 July. The role then passed to Muriel Pavlow in June 1977 and to Gabrielle Hamilton late the following year; the production finally closed in October 1979.

On 21 September 1977, while Murder at the Vicarage was still running at the Fortune, a stage adaptation by Leslie Darbon of A Murder Is Announced opened at the Vaudeville Theatre, with Dulcie Gray as Miss Marple. The show ran to the end of September 1978 and then toured.

Films

Margaret Rutherford
Margaret Rutherford played Miss Marple in four films directed by George Pollock between 1961 and 1964. These were successful light comedies, but Christie herself  was disappointed with them. Nevertheless, Agatha Christie dedicated the novel The Mirror Crack'd from Side to Side to Rutherford.

Rutherford presented the character as a bold and eccentric old lady, different from the prim and birdlike character Christie created in her novels. As penned by Christie, Miss Marple has never worked for a living, but the character as portrayed by Margaret Rutherford briefly works as a cook-housekeeper, a stage actress, a sailor and criminal reformer, and is offered the chance to run a riding establishment-cum-hotel. Her education and genteel background are hinted at when she mentions her awards at marksmanship, fencing, and equestrianism (although these hints are played for comedic value).

Murder, She Said (1961) was the first of the four British MGM productions starring Rutherford. This film was based on the 1957 novel 4:50 from Paddington (U.S. title, What Mrs. McGillicuddy Saw!), and the changes made in the plot were typical of the series. In the film, Mrs. McGillicuddy is cut from the plot. Miss Marple herself sees an apparent murder committed on a train running alongside hers. Actress Joan Hickson, who played Marple in the 1984–1992 television adaptations, has a role as a housekeeper in this movie.

Murder at the Gallop (1963), based on the 1953 Hercule Poirot novel After the Funeral (in this film, she is identified as Miss JTV Marple, though there was no indication as to what the extra initials might stand for).

Murder Most Foul (1964), based on the 1952 Poirot novel Mrs McGinty's Dead.

Murder Ahoy! (1964). The last film is not based on any Christie work but displays a few plot elements from They Do It With Mirrors (viz., the ship is used as a reform school for wayward boys and one of the teachers uses them as a crime force), and there is a kind of salute to The Mousetrap.

The music to all four films was composed and conducted by Ron Goodwin. The same theme is used on all four films with slight variations in each. The score was written within a couple of weeks by Goodwin who was approached by Pollock after Pollock had heard about him from Stanley Black. Black had worked with Pollock on Stranger in Town in 1957 and had previously hired Goodwin as his orchestrator.

Rutherford, who was 68 years old when the first film was shot in February 1961, insisted that she wear her own clothes during the filming of the movie, as well as having her husband, Stringer Davis, appear alongside her as the character Mr Stringer. The Rutherford films are frequently repeated on television in Germany, and in that country Miss Marple is generally identified with Rutherford's quirky portrayal.

Rutherford also appeared briefly as Miss Marple in the parodic Hercule Poirot adventure The Alphabet Murders (1965).

Angela Lansbury
In 1980, Angela Lansbury played Miss Marple in The Mirror Crack'd (EMI, directed by Guy Hamilton), based on Christie's 1962 novel. The film featured an all-star cast that included Elizabeth Taylor, Rock Hudson, Geraldine Chaplin, Tony Curtis, and Kim Novak. Edward Fox appeared as Inspector Craddock, who did Miss Marple's legwork. Lansbury's Marple was a crisp, intelligent woman who moved stiffly and spoke in clipped tones. Unlike most incarnations of Miss Marple, this one smoked cigarettes. Lansbury was later cast as Jessica Fletcher in Murder, She Wrote, a similar role.

Television
American TV was the setting for the first screen portrayal of Miss Marple with Gracie Fields, the British actress and singer, playing her in a 1956 episode of Goodyear TV Playhouse based on A Murder Is Announced, the 1950 Christie novel.

In 1970, the character of Miss Marple was portrayed by Inge Langen in a West German television adaptation of The Murder at the Vicarage  (Mord im Pfarrhaus).

In 2015, CBS planned a "much younger" version of the character, a granddaughter who takes over a California bookstore.

In 2018, Miss Marple was portrayed by Yunjin Kim in the South Korean television series Ms. Ma, Nemesis.

Helen Hayes
American stage and screen actress Helen Hayes portrayed Miss Marple in two American television films near the end of her decades-long acting career, both for CBS: A Caribbean Mystery (1983) and Murder with Mirrors (1985). Sue Grafton contributed to the screenplay of the former. Hayes's Marple was benign and chirpy. She had earlier appeared in a television film adaptation of the non-Marple Christie story Murder Is Easy, playing an elderly lady somewhat similar to Miss Marple.

Joan Hickson

From 1984 to 1992, the BBC adapted all of the original Miss Marple novels as a series titled Miss Marple. Joan Hickson played the lead role. In the 1940s, she had appeared on stage in an Agatha Christie play, Appointment with Death, which was seen by Christie who wrote in a note to her, "I hope one day you will play my dear Miss Marple". She portrayed a maid in the 1937 film, Love from a Stranger, which starred Ann Harding and Basil Rathbone, another Agatha Christie play adaptation. As well as portraying Miss Marple on television, Hickson narrated Miss Marple stories for audio books. In the "Binge!" article of Entertainment Weekly Issue #1343–1344 (26 December 2014 – 3 January 2015), the writers picked Hickson as "Best Marple" in the "Hercule Poirot & Miss Marple" timeline.

Listing of the TV series featuring Joan Hickson:
 The Body in the Library (1984)
 The Moving Finger (1985)
 A Murder Is Announced (1985)
 A Pocket Full of Rye (1985)
 The Murder at the Vicarage (1986) – BAFTA nomination
 Sleeping Murder (1987)
 At Bertram's Hotel (1987)
 Nemesis (1987) – BAFTA nomination
 4.50 from Paddington (1987)
 A Caribbean Mystery (1989)
 They Do It With Mirrors (1991)
 The Mirror Crack'd from Side to Side (1992)

Geraldine McEwan (2004–2008)/Julia McKenzie (2009–2013)

Beginning in 2004, ITV broadcast a series of adaptations of Agatha Christie's books under the title Agatha Christie's Marple, usually referred to as Marple. Geraldine McEwan starred in the first three series. Julia McKenzie took over the role in the fourth season.

The adaptations change the plots and characters of the original books (e.g. incorporating lesbian affairs, changing the identities of some killers, renaming or removing significant characters, and even using stories from other books in which Miss Marple did not originally feature). In the Geraldine McEwan series it is revealed that when she was young (portrayed by Julie Cox in a flashback), Miss Marple had an affair with a married soldier, Captain Ainsworth, who was killed in action in World War I, in December 1915. It is also said (in A Murder Is Announced) that she served as an ambulance driver during World War I.

Listing of the TV series featuring Geraldine McEwan and Julia McKenzie:
 The Body in the Library (2004)
 The Murder at the Vicarage (2004)
 4.50 from Paddington (2004)
 A Murder Is Announced (2005)
 Sleeping Murder (2005)
 The Moving Finger (2006)
 By the Pricking of My Thumbs (2006)
 The Sittaford Mystery (2006)
 At Bertram's Hotel (2007)
 Ordeal by Innocence (2007)
 Towards Zero (2008)
 Nemesis (2008)
 A Pocket Full of Rye (2009)
 Murder Is Easy (2009)
 They Do It with Mirrors (2010)
 Why Didn't They Ask Evans? (2011)
 The Pale Horse (2010)
 The Secret of Chimneys (2010)
 The Blue Geranium (2010)
 The Mirror Crack'd from Side to Side (2011)
 A Caribbean Mystery (2013)
 Greenshaw's Folly (2013)
 Endless Night (2013)

Anime

From 2004 to 2005, Japanese TV network NHK produced a 39 episode anime series titled Agatha Christie's Great Detectives Poirot and Marple, which features both Miss Marple and Hercule Poirot. Miss Marple's voice is provided by Kaoru Yachigusa. Episodes adapted both short stories and novels.

The anime series dramatised the following Miss Marple stories:
 Strange Jest (EP 3)
 The Case of the Perfect Maid (EP 4)
 The Tape-Measure Murder (EP 13)
 Ingots of Gold (EP 14)
 The Blue Geranium (EP 15)
 4.50 from Paddington (EP 21–24)
 Motive versus Opportunity (EP 27)
 Sleeping Murder (EP 30–33)

Radio

June Whitfield starred as Miss Marple in Michael Bakewell's adaptations of all twelve novels, broadcast on BBC Radio 4 between 1993 and 2001.

Three short stories with Whitfield ("Tape-Measure Murder", "The Case of the Perfect Maid" and "Sanctuary") were later broadcast under the collective title Miss Marple's Final Cases weekly 16 – 30 September 2015.

Other appearances

Marple was highlighted in volume 20 of the Case Closed manga's edition of "Gosho Aoyama's Mystery Library", a section of the graphic novels (usually the last page) where the author introduces a different detective (or occasionally, a villain) from mystery literature, television, or other media.

In the 1976 Neil Simon spoof Murder by Death, Miss Marple is parodied as "Miss Marbles" by Elsa Lanchester.

See also

 List of female detective characters

References

External links
 Miss Marple at the official Agatha Christie website
 Miss Marple on IMDb
 
 

 
Book series introduced in 1930
British novels adapted into films
British novels adapted into plays
Characters in British novels of the 20th century
Detective television series
Agatha Christie characters
Female characters in literature
Fictional amateur detectives
Literary characters introduced in 1927
Fictional English people
Novel series
Novels adapted into radio programs
British novels adapted into television shows